Preble is an unincorporated community in Preble Township, Adams County, in the U.S. state of Indiana.

History
A post office was established at Preble in 1883. It was named from Preble Township.

Sites
Preble includes a post office, a volunteer fire department, a granary and an outdoor arena.

Geography

References

Unincorporated communities in Adams County, Indiana
Unincorporated communities in Indiana